Sergei Viktorovich Ponomaryov (born 5 June 1953) is a Russian professional football coach and a former player.

Club career
As a player, he made his professional debut in the Soviet Second League in 1972 for FC Kuban Krasnodar.

References

1953 births
Living people
Soviet footballers
Association football defenders
Association football midfielders
FC Kuban Krasnodar players
PFC Spartak Nalchik players
Soviet football managers
Russian football managers
PFC Spartak Nalchik managers